Valarie Rae Miller (born April 16, 1974) is an American actress.

Early life
Born in Lafayette, Louisiana and raised in Fort Worth, Texas, Miller became interested in acting when she was quite young. She attended a high school for the performing arts and landed a number of high-profile commercials while still in college.

On summer vacation in Los Angeles, she took a course in stand-up comedy and went on to perform at such well-known clubs as The Improv and The Comedy Store. Despite offers to go on tour with her stand-up routine, Miller decided to move to Los Angeles and pursue acting.

Acting career
She's best known for her role as Original Cindy in Dark Angel (2000–2002). She hosted two game shows; one was the second season of Gladiators 2000, replacing Maria Sansone; the other was (along with Nick Spano) Peer Pressure. She also hosted One Saturday Morning on ABC. From Fall 2007 to May 2009, Miller appeared in the television drama Reaper on The CW. She also appeared in Crank, in the NCIS episode "Reunion", and in the Netflix film Reality High. She voiced Tiffany Fox, Lucius Fox's daughter, in Batman: The Enemy Within. She voices Wish Bear in Care Bears: Unlock the Magic on Boomerang. She also had a part in the 2002 film "All About the Benjamins" starring Ice Cube and Mike Epps.

Filmography

Film

Television

Video Games

External links
 

1974 births
African-American actresses
Living people
Actresses from Louisiana
People from Fort Worth, Texas
People from Lafayette, Louisiana
Actresses from Texas
American television actresses
21st-century African-American people
21st-century African-American women
20th-century African-American people
20th-century African-American women